The Chinese famine of 1920–1921 affected the Chinese provinces of Zhili, Shandong, Hunan, and Shanxi. The famine, caused by drought, was worsened by the lack of central authority in the power vacuum of the Warlord Era. An estimated 30 million people were directly affected by the famine, which resulted in the deaths of half a million people. The response to the famine was widely praised for the level of cooperation between the opposing warlord cliques in the transfer of refugees between famine stricken areas and areas not affected by the famine. The participation of international famine relief organizations aided in lowering levels of starvation, significantly decreasing the mortality rate in afflicted areas. This was in contrast to the ineffective famine relief present in the latter 1928-1930 famine, which was criticized for exacerbating the death toll.

References 

Famines in China
1921 in China
Warlord Era